Hermitage, The Hermitage or L'Hermitage may refer to:

 Hermitage (religious retreat), a place of religious seclusion

Places 

 The Hermitage Museum (est. 1754), in Saint Petersburg, Russia
 The Hermitage (Nashville, Tennessee), the estate of Andrew Jackson

Australia 

 The Hermitage (Australia), a school in Geelong, Victoria
 The Hermitage, Queensland, a locality in the Southern Downs Region
 The Hermitage, Ryde, a historic house in Sydney
 The Hermitage, Vaucluse, a historic house in Sydney
 Upper Hermitage, South Australia, a rural area near Adelaide
 Lower Hermitage, South Australia, a rural area near Adelaide.

Canada 
Hermitage, Edmonton, Alberta
 Hermitage–Sandyville, a small town in Newfoundland
 The Hermitage (Hamilton, Ontario), a historic house

Denmark 

 Hermitage Hunting Lodge, a royal hunting lodge north of Copenhagen

France 

 Crozes-Hermitage, a commune of the Drôme département
 L'Hermitage, a commune in the Ille-et-Vilaine département, in Brittany
 L'Hermitage-Lorge, a commune in the Côtes-d'Armor département, in Brittany
 Tain-l'Hermitage, a town and commune of the Drôme department in southern France, known for producing wine including Hermitage AOC

Germany 

 Hermitage Museum (Bayreuth)

Grenada 

 Hermitage in Saint Patrick Parish, Grenada

Hong Kong 

 The Hermitage, a private housing estate in Hong Kong

Ireland 

 Hermitage House, a former mansion in County Limerick

Italy 

 Hermitage of Camaldoli, a monastery in Naples, Campania, Italy

Jamaica 

 Hermitage Dam in Saint Andrew Parish, Jamaica

Mauritius 

 Hermitage Island

Monaco 

 Hôtel Hermitage Monte-Carlo, a luxury hotel in Monte-Carlo, Monaco

The Netherlands 

 Hermitage Amsterdam, a dependency of the Russian Hermitage Museum
 Hermitage (restaurant), a Michelin starred restaurant in Rijsoord, The Netherlands

New Zealand 

 The Hermitage Hotel, Mount Cook Village
 Mount Cook Village, sometimes called "The Hermitage" after the hotel

Russia 

 Hermitage Theatre, a theatre near the Hermitage museum in St. Petersburg
 Moscow Hermitage Garden, park in the central part of Moscow
 Hermitage Municipal Theatre (Tula)

Sri Lanka 

 Island Hermitage, Dodanduwa Island, Galle District; a monastery

United Kingdom

England 

 Hermitage, Berkshire, a village near Newbury
 Hermitage railway station, on the Didcot, Newbury and Southampton Railway
 Hermitage, Dorset, a hamlet near Sherborne
 Hermitage, West Sussex, a village near Southbourne, West Sussex
 Hermitage Green, a hamlet near the village of Winwick in Cheshire
 Hermitage Rooms, gallery and museum space in London
 Warkworth Hermitage in Northumberland, England
 The Hermitage (Hanwell), a cottage orné in Hanwell, London
 Hermitage Manor, a small manor house in Warwickshire

Scotland 
 Hermitage Castle, a historic fortress in the Scottish Borders
 Hermitage, Scottish Borders, a Scottish Borders village
 Hermitage Water, a river in Liddesdale in the Scottish Borders
 The Hermitage, Dunkeld, a National Trust for Scotland site
 The Hermitage and Ossian's Hall of Mirrors, at the above site
 Hermitage Primary School in Helensburgh
 The Hermitage, Friars Carse, a building used by the poet Robert Burns
 Hermitage of Braid, a park and nature reserve in Edinburgh

Northern Ireland 

 Hermitage, County Fermanagh, a townland in County Fermanagh

United States

Nashville, Tennessee 

 Hermitage Arboretum, located on the grounds of The Hermitage
 Hermitage, Tennessee, Nashville neighborhood adjacent to The Hermitage
 Hermitage station, a nearby passenger-rail station
 Hermitage Hotel, an historic hotel in Nashville

Other towns and communities 

 Hermitage, Arkansas, a town in Arkansas
 Hermitage, Louisiana, a community in southeastern Pointe Coupee Parish
 Hermitage, Missouri, a town in Missouri
 Hermitage, Pennsylvania, a city in Mercer County
 Hermitage, Saint Croix, United States Virgin Islands
 Hermitage, Saint John, United States Virgin Islands

Other structures and properties 

 Little Portion Hermitage, a religious community in Berryville, Arkansas
 New Camaldoli Hermitage, a Benedictine hermitage in Big Sur, California
 Hermitage (Pasadena, California), listed on the National Register of Historic Places (NRHP) in Pasadena, California
 The Hermitage (New Castle, Delaware), listed on the NRHP in Delaware
 Hermitage-Whitney Historic District, a U.S. historic district in Englewood, Florida
 Hermitage Plantation (Georgia), a former plantation near Savannah, Georgia
 The Hermitage (Brookville, Indiana), listed on the NRHP in Indiana
 The Hermitage (Goshen, Kentucky), listed on the NRHP in Kentucky
 Hermitage (Darrow, Louisiana), listed on the NRHP in Louisiana
 The Hermitage (La Plata, Maryland), listed on the NRHP in Maryland
 Guggenheim Hermitage Museum, in Paradise, Nevada
 The Hermitage (Ho-Ho-Kus, New Jersey), NRHP-listed historic site in Ho-Ho-Kus, New Jersey
 The Hermitage (Merry Hill, North Carolina), listed on the NRHP in North Carolina
 The Hermitage (Tillery, North Carolina), listed on the NRHP in North Carolina
 Hermitage High School (disambiguation)
 Hermitage Road Historic District, a Northside neighborhood in Richmond, Virginia
 The Hermitage (Virginia Beach, Virginia), listed on the NRHP in Virginia
 The Hermitage (Charles Town, West Virginia), listed on National Register of Historic Places (NRHP)
 Hermitage Motor Inn in Petersburg, West Virginia, listed on National Register of Historic Places (NRHP)

People 

 René de Saunière de l'Hermitage (1653–1729), an English Huguenot exile
 Robbyn Hermitage, a Canadian badminton player

Ships 

 USS Hermitage (AP-54), troop transport launched in 1925 as the Italian liner , renamed in 1942
 , Thomaston-class dock landing ship launched in 1956; transferred to Brazilian Navy as Ceará (C-30) in 1989

Viticulture, grapes, and winemaking 

 Syrah grape, called "Hermitage" in Australia
 Cinsaut grape, called "Hermitage" in South Africa and parts of Europe
 Marsanne grape, sometimes called "Ermitage", "Hermitage", or "White Hermitage"
 Hermitage AOC, French wine appellation
 Crozes-Hermitage AOC, French wine appellation

Other 

 Hermitage (album), a 2021 album by Moonspell
 Hermitage Capital Management, an investment fund specializing in Russian investment
 4758 Hermitage, an asteroid

See also 
 Hermitage Academy (disambiguation)
 Hermit (disambiguation)